Algernon Sydney Hartridge (August 4, 1831 – April 4, 1876) was a cotton merchant and lieutenant in the Confederate States Army during the American Civil War.

Life and career
Hartridge was born on August 4, 1831, to Charles Hartridge and Mary Hubbard Green. He was one of their three sons, the others being Julian and Alfred.

In 1855, he married Susan Enoch Knight. They had five children: Ada, Charles, Gazaway, Algernon Jr. and an infant born who was stillborn in 1863. Algernon Jr. died aged six months.

His family were members of Christ Church on Savannah's Bull Street.

Hartridge set up a cotton factor business at 92 Bay Street. He also became a member of the Savannah Chamber of Commerce, as well as serving on the board of the Oglethorpe Insurance Company in 1864, of the Savannah National Bank (from 1865 to 1868), of the Tyler Cotton Press Company (1871) and of the Central Railroad and Banking Company of Georgia (from 1871 to 1876).

On June 4, 1861, a meeting was held to elect officers of the DeKalb Riflemen Company A. Algernon was elected first lieutenant; his brother, Alfred, was elected a captain.

In 1868, Hartridge had built the row house at 202–206 East Gaston Street in Savannah. Other buildings he owned include the property at 119 East Charlton Street (built in 1852), the Algernon Hartridge Duplex at 105–107 Jones Street (1869) and the Algernon Hartridge House at 516 Abercorn Street (1870), a block east of Forsyth Park. The latter property is now known as Keys Hall, part of the Savannah College of Art and Design.

Death
Hartridge died from hepatitis in Savannah on April 4, 1876, aged 44. After a funeral at Christ Church on April 7, he was interred in the city's Laurel Grove Cemetery. His pallbearers included Joseph E. Johnston, Confederate general, and Henry R. Jackson, major general. His wife joined him there upon her death nine years later. She had been declared insane in 1888, two years after she had become a widow. Her son, Charles, became her guardian.

References

1831 births
1876 deaths
Confederate States Army officers
19th-century American military personnel
People from Savannah, Georgia